"Kind & Generous" is a song by American singer-songwriter Natalie Merchant, released as the first single from her second studio album, Ophelia (1998). It became a radio hit in North America, peaking at number 18 on the US Billboard Hot 100 Airplay chart and number 19 in Canada. The song was not eligible to chart on the Billboard Hot 100 since it was not released as a commercial single.

Music video
The music video made for this song features Natalie Merchant as part of a traveling circus and taking on many guises. The circus performers were actual performers from the local area and the little girl was the daughter of the proprietor-showperson.

Track listing
European HDCD single and Australian CD single
 "Kind & Generous" (LP version) – 4:05
 "Frozen Charlotte" (LP version) – 5:25
 "Wonder" (LP version) – 4:26

Credits and personnel
Credits are lifted from the Ophelia liner notes.

Studios
 Recorded at Talking Dwarf Studios (Little Valley, New York)
 Mixed at Oceanway Recording Studios (Los Angeles)
 Mastered at Gateway Mastering Studios (Portland, Maine, US)

Personnel

 Natalie Merchant – writing, vocals
 Lokua Kanza – acoustic guitar
 Craig Ross – electric guitar
 Graham Maby – bass
 George Laks – Hammond, Wurlitzer
 Peter Yanowitz – drums
 Joakim Lartey – percussion
 Jim Scott – mixing
 Mike Scotella – mixing assistance
 Todd Vos – engineering
 Bob Ludwig – mastering

Charts

Weekly charts

Year-end charts

Use in media
The Orchestra of the Bronx performed an orchestral version of the song in a 2020 commercial for Montefiore Health System that paid tribute to healthcare workers during the COVID-19 pandemic.

References

 [ Ophelia] at Allmusic

1996 songs
1998 singles
Elektra Records singles
Natalie Merchant songs
Songs written by Natalie Merchant